Harinavi is a neighbourhood in the Rajpur Sonarpur of the South 24 Parganas district in the Indian state of West Bengal. It is a part of the area covered by the Kolkata Metropolitan Development Authority (KMDA).

History
Many janapadas grew up along the old Bhagirathi channel from the ancient times till around the 16th century: Kalighat, Boral, Rajpur, Harinavi, Mahinagar, Baruipur, Baharu, Jaynagar, Majilpur, Chhatrabhog etc. Bipradas Pipilai's Manasavijaya, composed in 1495, mentions many places in this region. “Chand Sadagar, a merchant character of the Manasavijaya, reached Baruipur, from Kalighat, through the old Bhagirathi channel. From there he proceeded towards Chhatrabhog, and then traveling through Hatiagarh pargana reached the open sea.” Chaitanyadeva (1486-1534) also went through this route. Travelling by boat to Puri he halted at the village of Atisara, near Baruipur. "His last stoppage in 24 Parganas was at Chhatrabhog, now a village within the jurisdiction of the Mathurapur police station. Chhatrabhog seems to have been an important river-port on the old Bhagirathi channel." Rama Chandra Khan, the zamindar of Chhatrabhog, helped Chaitanyadeva to continue with his journey.

Geography

Area overview
Baruipur subdivision is a rural subdivision with moderate levels of urbanization. 31.05% of the population lives in the urban areas and 68.95% lives in the rural areas. In the northern portion of the subdivision (shown in the map alongside) there are 10 census towns. The entire district is situated in the Ganges Delta and the northern part of the subdivision is a flat plain bordering the metropolis of Kolkata.

Note: The map alongside presents some of the notable locations in the subdivision. All places marked in the map are linked in the larger full screen map.

Location

Transport
Harinavi is on the State Highway 1.

Subhashgram railway station is located nearby.

Education
 Harinavi DVAS High School is a Bengali-medium coeducational school. It was established in 1866 and has facilities for teaching from class V to class XII.

Healthcare
Sonarpur Rural Hospital, with 25 beds, at Rajpur Sonarpur, is the major government medical facility in the Sonarpur CD block.

References

External links
 

Cities and towns in South 24 Parganas district
Neighbourhoods in Kolkata
Kolkata Metropolitan Area